Jorge Fitch  (30 March 1934 – 15 April 2021) was a Mexican professional baseball player and manager. As a shortstop, he played for the Tigres del México, Pericos de Puebla, Broncos/Bravos de Reynosa, and Estibadores de Tampico of the Mexican League.

Fitch accumulated 1,676 hits in 1,670 games for a .272 lifetime batting average. During the winter, he played 10 seasons with the Naranjeros de Hermosillo, Mayos de Navojoa and Yaquis de Obregón of the Mexican Pacific League.

He started his managerial career in 1972 with Broncos de Reynosa and would later manage the Tecolotes de Nuevo Laredo, Pericos de Puebla and Alacranes de Durango. He posted an 829–421 managing record in eight seasons, appearing in five playoff series, while winning two championships with Tecolotes de Nuevo Laredo in 1977 and with Angeles Negros de Puebla in 1979.

Managerial achievements

References

External links

1934 births
2021 deaths
Baseball players from Sinaloa
Bravos de Reynosa players
Broncos de Reynosa players
Caribbean Series managers
Estibadores de Tampico players
Mayos de Navojoa players
Mexican Baseball Hall of Fame inductees
Mexican League baseball managers
Mexican League baseball shortstops
Naranjeros de Hermosillo players
Pericos de Puebla players
Tigres del México players
Yaquis de Obregón players
People from Navolato